Tomasz Frankowski (born 16 August 1974) is a Polish former professional footballer who played as a striker. With 168 goals in 302 matches in Polish Ekstraklasa he is the league's third all-time scorer and was top league goalscorer four times.

Frankowski achieved his greatest success at Wisła Kraków of Poland, where he helped fire them to a collection of domestic honours. He also played in France, Japan, Spain, England, and the United States.

He was capped 22 times for the Poland national team, scoring ten goals. After his retirement, he was elected to the European Parliament for the Civic Platform in 2019.

Club career

Early years and Wisła Kraków
As a native of Białystok, Frankowski began his career with his home town team Jagiellonia Białystok in 1991, before heading for France to play for RC Strasbourg (1993–1996), followed by a brief stint at Nagoya Grampus Eight of Japan (1996). He then returned to France to play for CFP Poitiers (1996–1997) and FC Martigues (1997–1998), before returning to his home country to play for Wisła Kraków.

His time at Wisła brought him his greatest successes, he helped the club win five Polish Championship titles (in 1999, 2001, 2003, 2004, 2005), two Polish Cups (in 2002 and 2003), and a Polish SuperCup in 2001. He was also the league's top scorer three times: with Wisla in 1999, 2001, and 2005 and with Jagiellonia in 2011.

Elche
In August 2005, Spanish Segunda División club Elche CF signed Frankowski. Neighbours Levante UD complained that they had secured him, and that Elche should pay them a €6 million release clause. He made his debut on 11 September as a 71st-minute substitute in a 1–0 loss at precisely that team. A week later, in his first home game, he opened the scoring in a 2–0 win over Polideportivo Ejido. He totalled eight goals in 14 games during his time at the Estadio Manuel Martínez Valero, including a hat-trick on 8 December in a 4–1 win over Numancia.

Wolverhampton Wanderers
On 25 January 2006, Frankowski signed a 2-year deal at Wolverhampton Wanderers, four points off the play-off places in England's Football League Championship. He signed for  £1.4 million fee after being tracked by manager Glenn Hoddle, and Elche president Ramón Suárez resigned after losing the striker.

In August 2006, having not scored for Wolves, Frankowski was loaned back to Spain's second tier at Tenerife for the 2006–07 season. He scored three times in 18 games, including the opener on his home debut on 17 September in a 3–2 win over Hércules.

Upon returning to Molineux for training, he was challenged by manager Mick McCarthy to 'earn his transfer' to another club after no offers arrived for the striker with a year still remaining on his contract. However, he suffered a knee injury in pre-season training and was unable to attempt any action. By mutual consent, the club terminated his contract on 31 August 2007.

Chicago Fire
After a period of inactivity, Frankowski headed to join up with the Chicago Fire, finally signing a deal on 19 February 2008. He scored his first – and only – two goals for the club on 3 April during their home opener against the New England Revolution. However, as the season continued, his playing time greatly diminished, and he was regularly not even listed in the team's bench lineup. A possible cause of this was his critique of Fire Head Coach Denis Hamlett and his coaching style. On 26 November, Frankowski was released to help free up their salary cap after being one of the highest paid players on the team in the 2008 season.

Return to Jagiellonia Białystok
On 23 December 2008, Jagiellonia Białystok announced that Frankowski would rejoin his hometown team on a two-year contract. On 28 March 2010, he scored two goals in the 2–0 win over Arka Gdynia, surpassing Friedrich Scherfke and becoming Ekstraklasa's 9th all-time top scorer with 132 goals, the most for any active player.

On 1 August 2010, Frankowski won his second Polish Supercup with Jagiellonia, scoring the only goal of a win against Lech Poznań. In the 2010–11 season, he was the top scorer for the fourth in his career by scoring 14 goals. On 30 March 2013, he scored his 167th goal in top Polish tier, following up with his 168th goal on 6 April in his 295th game, thereby becoming Ekstraklasa's third all-time scorer, exceeding 167 goals mark set in 1950s by Gerard Cieślik. He retired after the 2012–13 season.

International career

Frankowski scored ten goals in 22 appearances for the Poland national team. He made his senior international debut on 28 April 1999 in a 2–1 win over the Czech Republic and netted his first international goal the following year, against Iceland.

He was Poland's top scorer in their qualifying campaign for the 2006 World Cup in Germany, but his poor form for Wolves in 2006 meant that he was omitted from the tournament squad. He called manager Paweł Janas a backstabber and criticised his indirectness, as he and Jerzy Dudek had learned of their omissions from journalists and not the manager. He returned to the international fold after this, under new coach Leo Beenhakker, but won only two further caps.

Honours
Strasbourg
 UEFA Intertoto Cup: 1995

Wisła Kraków
 Ekstraklasa: 1999, 2001, 2003, 2004, 2005
 Polish Cup: 2001–02, 2002–03
 Polish Ekstraklasa Cup: 2001
 Polish SuperCup: 2001
 Ekstraklasa top scorer: 1999, 2001, 2005

Jagiellonia Białystok
 Polish Cup: 2009–10
 Polish SuperCup: 2010
 Ekstraklasa top scorer: 2011

Political activity
Frankowski is a member of Civic Platform led by Donald Tusk. In European Parliament election in 2019 he was elected from the first place in Podlaskie and Warmian-Masurian constituency. In 2021, he voiced his opposition to the planned European Super League and to holding the World Cup every two years.

References

External links

 
 
 Tomasz Frankowski  at jagiellonia.neostrada.pl  
 
 

1974 births
Living people
Sportspeople from Białystok
Polish footballers
Polish expatriate footballers
Poland international footballers
Association football forwards
Jagiellonia Białystok players
RC Strasbourg Alsace players
Nagoya Grampus players
Stade Poitevin FC players
FC Martigues players
Wisła Kraków players
Elche CF players
Wolverhampton Wanderers F.C. players
CD Tenerife players
Chicago Fire FC players
Expatriate footballers in France
Expatriate footballers in Japan
Expatriate footballers in Spain
Expatriate footballers in England
Expatriate soccer players in the United States
Ekstraklasa players
Ligue 1 players
J1 League players
Ligue 2 players
English Football League players
Major League Soccer players
Polish sportsperson-politicians
Civic Platform MEPs
MEPs for Poland 2019–2024